Francis Odartey Lamptey (born October 16, 1991), known by the stage name Jamin Beats, is a Ghanaian Afro pop singer, producer and songwriter based in Maplewood, New Jersey. He won the US-based Uncovered Artist of the Year at the 2020 Ghana Music Awards USA.

Early life and career
Jamin Beats hails from Nleshi James Town, a suburb of Accra. He had his senior high school education at Adisadel College, Cape Coast. He then proceeded to the Wisconsin International University College for his tertiary education. 
He started music in 2002, but took a break in order to focus on music production, upon his return he released single "Me Twi" in 2016.

Discography

Album 
  Dreams to Success  2018

Major singles
 Me Twi  2016
 Dutty Wine  2018 
 Sugar Mama  2018
 Lies  2018
 Suvivor (Breast Cancer)  2017
 Bumper  2018
 Give Me Your Love  2018
 Tonight  2018
 Love You More  2018
 Fire  featuring Gemini Orleans 2018 
 Long Tin 2019 
 Another Man 2020  
 Nana Nyame featuring Nana NYC 2021 
 Makoma 2021

Awards

References

1991 births
Living people
21st-century Ghanaian male singers
21st-century Ghanaian singers
Ghanaian songwriters
Musicians from Accra